Yu Xuntan (11 November 1931 – 23 November 2019), known by his pen name Liu Shahe, was a Chinese writer and poet. The son of a Sichuan landowner who was executed in the Land Reform Movement, he began publishing in 1948 and became a professional writer in 1952. He co-founded the poetry magazine Stars in 1956, but was denounced as a "filial descendant of the landlord class" when the Anti-Rightist Campaign began in 1957. For the next two decades he performed hard labour and was exiled to the countryside until the end of the Cultural Revolution. He resumed publishing in 1978, and his collection, Poems of Liu Shahe (1982), won the National Prize for Poetry.

Biography 
Yu Xuntan was born on 11 November 1931 in Chengdu, the capital of Sichuan province, Republic of China. His parents were small landowners from Jintang County near Chengdu, and the family moved back to Jintang in 1935. His father worked for the Kuomintang government, and for that reason was killed by the Communist Party during the Land Reform Movement.

He entered Sichuan University in 1949, majoring in agricultural chemistry. He began writing in 1948, and served as an editor of a supplement to the newspaper Western Sichuan Peasant Daily. He became a professional writer in 1952, and joined the predecessor of the Communist Youth League of China that same year.

In 1955, Liu published his first poem, which was well received by critics, and became a poet almost exclusively. The following year, he published The Country Nocturnes, his first poetry collection, and was admitted to the Academy of Literature. Together with three other poets, he founded Stars, a monthly poetry magazine, in 1956. He wrote the poem series entitled "Grass and Stars" for the inaugural issue of the magazine, but was criticized soon after its publication.

When the Anti-Rightist Campaign began in 1957, Liu was denounced as a "filial descendant of the landlord class" and forced to undergo reform through labour for the next eight years, working all sorts of jobs including labourer and librarian. During the subsequent Cultural Revolution, he was exiled in Jintang without a job. He continued to compose poems in this period, but most of them were lost.

After the end of the Cultural Revolution, Liu resumed publishing in 1978. His collection, Poems of Liu Shahe (1982), was awarded the National Prize for Poetry. Many of his poems expressed a sense of loss over his youth and sentimentality for the years he spent as a downtrodden labourer. Other poems, written in a serene tone, recorded the emotional solace he found in the difficult times. He wrote less poetry after the mid-1980s, and spent much time publishing and commenting on modern Taiwanese poetry.

Liu was an outspoken critic of the simplification of Chinese characters. He wrote a dedicated column entitled "Simplified Characters are Unreasonable" in the Chinese-language edition of the Financial Times.

Selected books
The Country Nocturnes 农村夜曲 (1956), first collection of poems
Windows 窗 (1956), collection of short stories
Farewell to Mars 告别火星 (1957), second collection of poems
Poems of Liu Shahe 流沙河诗话 (1982), winner of the National Prize for Poetry
Track of the Wanderer 游踪 (1983), collection of poems
Goodbye, Hometown 故园别 (1983), collection of poems
Twelve Taiwan Poets 台湾诗人十二家, commentary on Taiwanese poetry
Talking of Poetry Across the Sea 隔海说诗, commentary on Taiwanese poetry
Sources:

Personal life 
Liu married in 1966. He had a daughter and a son, Yu Kun.

Liu died in Chengdu on 23 November 2019 from complications of throat cancer, aged 88.

See also
Tie Liu, a fellow Sichuanese writer denounced and imprisoned as a "rightist"

References

1931 births
2019 deaths
Writers from Chengdu
People's Republic of China poets
Victims of the Anti-Rightist Campaign
Poets from Sichuan
Sichuan University alumni
Chinese magazine publishers (people)
20th-century Chinese poets
21st-century Chinese poets
Chinese literary critics
Deaths from throat cancer
Deaths from cancer in the People's Republic of China
Victims of the Cultural Revolution